There have been two baronetcies created for members of the Wolseley family, one in the Baronetage of England and one in the Baronetage of Ireland. As of 2018, the Wolseley Baronetcy of Mount Wolseley is dormant.

History
The Wolseleys of Staffordshire (and later, Ireland) are an ancient family whose record goes back a thousand years, to Sewardus, Lord Wisele, and are descended from Edward III. Ralph Wolseley served as Baron of the Exchequer for Edward IV.

Wolseley baronets (1628 creation)

The Wolseley Baronetcy, of Wolseley in the County of Stafford, was created in the Baronetage of England on 24 November 1628 for Robert Wolseley, the member of an ancient Staffordshire family and a Colonel in Charles I's army. The second Baronet represented Oxfordshire, Staffordshire and Stafford in the House of Commons and was a member of Oliver Cromwell's House of Lords. The sixth Baronet was a Gentleman of the Privy Chamber to King George III.

Many members of the Wolseleys of Wolseley Hall are buried at St Michael and All Angels Church in Colwich, a short distance from Shugborough Hall. Inside the church are many tombs, wall tablets and other memorials connected with the landed gentry in the parish. A tablet also commemorates Field Marshal Garnet Wolseley, 1st Viscount Wolseley, KP, GCB, OM, GCMG, VD, PC (1833–1913), a distant relative of the Wolseleys of Wolseley Hall who is buried in the crypt of St Paul's Cathedral, London.

Wolseley Hall, the family seat, was at Wolseley Park near Rugeley, Staffordshire. The old house was demolished in 1954 and the commercial ventures of the 11th Baronet created financial difficulties which led to the enforced sale of the estate in 1996.

Wolseley baronets (1745 creation)
The Wolseley Baronetcy, of Mount Wolseley in the County of Carlow, was created in the Baronetage of Ireland on 19 January 1745 for Richard Wolseley, who sat as a member of the Irish House of Commons for Carlow. He was the younger brother of the fifth Baronet of the 1628 creation. Consequently, the holder of the baronetcy is also in remainder to the Wolseley Baronetcy of Wolseley.

As of 7 May 2018, there is "no clear or undisputed successor" to the baronetcy according to the Standing Council of the Baronetage, with the title having sat dormant since the death of the 12th Baronet in 1991. The most senior known heir is James Douglas Wolseley (born 1937) of Texas.

The family seat was Mount Wolseley House, near Tullow, County Carlow.

Holders of the titles

Wolseley baronets (1628 creation)

Sir Robert Wolseley, 1st Baronet (–1646)
Sir Charles Wolseley, 2nd Baronet (c. 1630–1714)
Sir William Wolseley, 3rd Baronet (c. 1660–1728)
Sir Henry Wolseley, 4th Baronet (died 1730)
Sir William Wolseley, 5th Baronet (died 1779)
Sir William Wolseley, 6th Baronet (1740–1817)
Sir Charles Wolseley, 7th Baronet (1769–1846)
Sir Charles Wolseley, 8th Baronet (1813–1854)
Sir Charles Michael Wolseley, 9th Baronet (1846–1931)
Sir Edric Charles Joseph Wolseley, 10th Baronet (1886–1954)
Sir Charles Garnet Richard Mark Wolseley, 11th Baronet (1944–2018)
Sir Stephen Garnet Hugo Charles Wolseley, 12th Baronet (born 1980)

The heir apparent is the present holder's son Nicholas William Garnet Wolseley (born 2010).

Wolseley baronets (1745 creation)

Sir Richard Wolseley, 1st Baronet (1696–1769)
Sir Richard Wolseley, 2nd Baronet (1729–1781)
Sir William Wolseley, 3rd Baronet (1775–1819)
Sir Richard Wolseley, 4th Baronet (1760–1852)
Sir Clement Wolseley, 5th Baronet (1794–1857)
Sir John Richard Wolseley, 6th Baronet (1834–1874)
Sir Clement James Wolseley, 7th Baronet (1837–1889)
Sir John Wolseley, 8th Baronet (1803–1890)
Sir Capel Charles Wolseley, 9th Baronet (1870–1923)
Sir Reginald Wolseley, 10th Baronet (1872–1933)
Sir William Augustus Wolseley, 11th Baronet (1865–1950)
Sir Garnet Wolseley, 12th Baronet (1915–1991), a cobbler, son of Richard Bingham Wolseley (1853–1938), of Wallasey, Cheshire, a descendant of the 1st Baronet.
James Douglas Wolseley, possible 13th Baronet (born 1937), son of James Douglas Wolseley (1903–1960), of Fort Worth, Texas, U.S.A., a descendant of the 1st Baronet, third cousin once removed of the 12th Baronet, and Olive, daughter of Carroll Walter Wofford.

References

Baronetcies in the Baronetage of England
Baronetcies in the Baronetage of Ireland
1628 establishments in England
1745 establishments in Ireland